Kill Them All and Come Back Alone (Italian: Ammazzali tutti e torna solo) is a 1968 Italian Spaghetti Western film directed by Enzo G. Castellari. It stars American actors Chuck Connors and Frank Wolff, and features a film score by Francesco De Masi.

Synopsis
During the American Civil War, Clyde McKay recruits a group of skilled fighters and unrepentant murderers to steal a box of gold from a Union Western camp that the Confederate States of America are coveting on. McKay is ordered by Confederate Intelligence Captain Lynch that once he has completed his mission he is to "kill them all and come back alone". Lynch leads the unsuspecting group on their mission, which faces not only the Union Army, but a large amount of double-crosses along the way.

Cast
 Chuck Connors as Clyde McKay/Link
 Frank Wolff as Captain Lynch
 Franco Citti as Hoagy
 Leo Anchóriz as Deker/Dexter
 Giovanni Cianfriglia (as Ken Wood) as Blade
 Alberto Dell'Acqua as the Kid
 Hercules Cortez as Bogard
 Furio Menicori (as Men Fury) as Buddy
 Alfonso Rojas as Sergeant
 John Bartha as Prison camp captain
 Vincenzo Maggio as Soldier
 Osiride Pevarello as Soldier
 Sergio Citti as Soldier
 Antonio Molino Rojo as Soldier
 Pietro Torrisi as Soldier
 Ugo Adinolfi
 C. Fantoni

Releases 
Wild East Productions released this on a limited edition DVD in 2008.

References

External links
 

1968 films
Spaghetti Western films
1960s Italian-language films
English-language Italian films
1960s English-language films
Films directed by Enzo G. Castellari
1968 Western (genre) films
American Civil War films
Films scored by Francesco De Masi
Films shot in Almería
1960s multilingual films
Italian multilingual films
1960s American films
1960s Italian films